African small white may refer to
 Dixeia charina, a butterfly endemic to Africa's east coast from the Horn of Africa to the Cape region
 Dixeia doxo, a butterfly endemic to Africa's east coast and large parts of central Africa

Animal common name disambiguation pages